Hussein Nassor Amar (born 20 April 1958) is a Tanzanian CCM politician and Member of Parliament for Nyanghwale constituency since 2010.

References

1958 births
Living people
Chama Cha Mapinduzi MPs
Tanzanian MPs 2010–2015